Fastlane is an American action/crime drama series that was broadcast on Fox from September 18, 2002 to April 25, 2003. On August 14, 2005 G4 began rebroadcasting the complete series.

Plot summary
Van Ray and Deaqon Hayes are two mismatched cops teamed together by shady police lieutenant, Wilhelmina "Billie" Chambers, in a secretive undercover division of the Los Angeles Police Department. Operating with the motto "Everything we seize, we keep. Everything we keep, we use," their base of operations is the "Candy Store"—a warehouse containing a fortune in confiscated cars, clothes, weapons and everything else needed to blend into the seedy criminal underworld of Los Angeles. Given criminal covers, the officers use all of the resources at their disposal to apprehend dangerous criminals while walking the line between cop and criminal.

Cast

Main 
 Peter Facinelli as Donovan "Van" Ray
 Bill Bellamy as Deaqon "Deaq" Hayes
 Tiffani Thiessen as Wilhemina "Billie" Chambers

Recurring 
 Jay Mohr as Roland Hill
 Mark Famiglietti as Jarod
 Big Boy as Aquarius
 Vondie Curtis-Hall as Andre Hayes
 Jennifer Sky as Cassidy Shaw
 Robert Forster as Raymond Ray
 Jamie Brown as Sophia Jones
 Bill Duke as Captain Parish
 Lamont Johnson as Wisdom Bailey

Guest appearances 
Over the course of its run, Fastlane featured cameos and guest appearances from several known figures, including Fred Durst, Dale Earnhardt Jr., Mischa Barton, Jenny McCarthy, Krista Allen, Jake Busey, Bokeem Woodbine, Hudson Leick, Jaime Pressly, George Hamilton, Eric Mabius, Michelle Forbes, Navi Rawat, Iggy Pop, Naomi Campbell, Tommy Lee, Terrence Howard, Isaac Hayes, the Red Elvises, Tatyana Ali, Natasha Alam, Paul Gleason, Antonio Fargas, Biz Markie, Kurupt, Treach and Ali Landry. Actor Randall Park also appeared on the show.

Series run
The series consisted of twenty-two episodes, forty-five minutes each, plus an unaired pilot which ended up being very similar to the first episode broadcast. Episodes 13 and 14 ("Defense" and "Offense") form a two-part story, while episodes 21 and 22 ("Dosed" and "Iced") form a two-part story ending on a cliffhanger which sees Billie Chambers kidnapped and forced to do drugs. As the series was canceled at that point due to the high costs of each episode, there is no known resolution.

Each episode cost the two studios making it (Warner Bros. and Fox) $2.6 million. The show's hallmarks—unconventional cinematography, pyrotechnics, guest appearances, licensed soundtracks, supercars and other exotic vehicles—were the root cause of the exorbitant production costs.

Cancellation
After Fox canceled Firefly in December 2002, Fastlane was moved from Wednesday nights to Fridays as a midseason replacement for Firefly. The show suffered as a result of this airdate move and never recovered. With high production costs and the ratings dropping, Fastlane was canceled in March 2003.

Fastlane gained a cult following especially for the chemistry between the cast, the action scenes, the humor and the direction.

Episodes

Home media
Warner Home Video released Fastlane: The Complete Series on DVD as a six disc set on July 8, 2008 in the Region 1. The soundtrack was significantly altered for the DVD release due to licensing issues. Episodes are cropped to be in the 4:3 format rather than the 16:9 widescreen format as they initially appeared on television.

References

External links
 

2002 American television series debuts
2003 American television series endings
2000s American crime drama television series
2000s American police procedural television series
American action television series
English-language television shows
Fox Broadcasting Company original programming
Fictional portrayals of the Los Angeles Police Department
Television series by 20th Century Fox Television
Television series by Warner Bros. Television Studios
Television series by Wonderland Sound and Vision
Television series created by John McNamara (writer)
Television shows set in Los Angeles
Works by McG